The 2020 Open Sud de France was a tennis tournament played on indoor hard courts. It was the 33rd edition of the event, and part of the ATP Tour 250 series of the 2020 ATP Tour. It took place at the Arena Montpellier in Montpellier, France, from February 3 to February 9, 2020.

Singles main-draw entrants

Seeds 

 1 Rankings are as of January 20, 2020.

Other entrants 
The following players received wildcards into the singles main draw:
  Félix Auger-Aliassime
  Grigor Dimitrov
  Gaël Monfils

The following player received entry using a protected ranking into the singles main draw:
  Vasek Pospisil

The following players received entry from the qualifying draw:
  Enzo Couacaud 
  Damir Džumhur
  Emil Ruusuvuori 
  Sergiy Stakhovsky

Withdrawals 
Before the tournament
  Radu Albot → replaced by  Grégoire Barrère
  Dan Evans → replaced by  Norbert Gombos
  Fabio Fognini → replaced by  Pierre-Hugues Herbert
  John Millman → replaced by  Jannik Sinner
  Lucas Pouille → replaced by  Mikael Ymer
  Andrey Rublev → replaced by  Henri Laaksonen
  Stan Wawrinka → replaced by  Dennis Novak

Retirements 
  Richard Gasquet

ATP doubles main-draw entrants

Seeds 

1 Rankings as of January 20, 2020.

Other entrants 
The following pairs received wildcards into the doubles main draw:
  Kenny de Schepper /  Hugo Gaston
  Feliciano López /  Marc López

The following pair received entry as alternates:
  Julian Knowle /  Dennis Novak

Withdrawals 
Before the tournament
  Tim Pütz

Champions

Singles 

  Gaël Monfils def.  Vasek Pospisil, 7–5, 6–3

Doubles 

  Nikola Ćaćić /  Mate Pavić def.  Dominic Inglot /  Aisam-ul-Haq Qureshi, 6–4, 6–7(4–7), [10–4]

References

External links